Hem Khorn is a Cambodian politician. He belongs to the Cambodian People's Party and was elected to represent Kampong Speu Province in the National Assembly of Cambodia in 2003.

References

Members of the National Assembly (Cambodia)
Members of the Senate (Cambodia) 
Cambodian People's Party politicians
Living people
Year of birth missing (living people)